Prof. Emeritus Dr. Direk Lavansiri is the Professor Emeritus of Engineering at Chulalongkorn University.

In 2002 and 2003, Lavansiri was awarded the Thailand Quality Class Award for Performance Excellence, under the “organization” category.

References 

Direk Lavansiri
Living people
Direk Lavansiri
1949 births